NGC 2998 is a barred spiral galaxy located in the constellation Ursa Major. It is 195 million light-years (59.7 megaparsecs) away from the Earth. It is an intermediate spiral galaxy. Its stellar mass is about that of the Milky Way.

NGC 2998 is a member of the eponymous NGC 2998 group, a relatively dense galaxy group which also includes NGC 3002, NGC 3005, NGC 3006, NGC 3008 and a few others.

See also
 List of NGC objects (2001–3000)

References

External links
 

Intermediate spiral galaxies
2998
5250
Ursa Major (constellation)
028196